Andrey Ivanov (born 12 April 1973) is a Russian freestyle skier. He competed at the 1992 Winter Olympics and the 1998 Winter Olympics.

References

1973 births
Living people
Russian male freestyle skiers
Olympic freestyle skiers of the Unified Team
Olympic freestyle skiers of Russia
Freestyle skiers at the 1992 Winter Olympics
Freestyle skiers at the 1998 Winter Olympics
Sportspeople from Krasnoyarsk